is a city located in Chiba Prefecture, Japan. , the city had an estimated population of  37,206 in 17,004 households and a population density of 240 persons per km².

Geography
Isumi is located on the east coast of southern Chiba Prefecture, on the Bōsō Peninsula. It is bordered by the Pacific Ocean to the east, and enjoys a temperate maritime climate, with short, cool winters and hot, humid summers due to the effects of the Kuroshio Current offshore. The area is noted for its beach resorts, which are at the end of the Kujūkuri Beach area, and the landscape consists of rolling, sandy hills. The Isumi River, a small river which runs through this portion of the peninsula, empties into the Pacific Ocean at Misaki. Parts of the city are within the Minami Bōsō Quasi-National Park. Mount Arakine is the highest point in the city, with an elevation of 157.8 meters. The city is approximately 45 kilometers from the prefectural capital of Chiba and 70 to 80 kilometers from central Tokyo.

Surrounding municipalities
Chiba Prefecture
Ichinomiya
Katsuura
Mutsuzawa
Ōtaki
Onjuku

Climate
Isumi has a humid subtropical climate (Köppen Cfa) characterized by warm summers and cool winters with light to no snowfall.  The average annual temperature in Isumi is 15.4 °C. The average annual rainfall is 1834 mm with September as the wettest month. The temperatures are highest on average in August, at around 25.8 °C, and lowest in January, at around 6.0 °C.

Demographics
Per Japanese census data, the population of Isumi has declined in recent decades

History
Isumi is part of ancient Kazusa Province. The place name is very ancient, appearing even in the Nihon Shoki, which mentions the area as the source of abalone and pearls for the Yamato court during the reign of the Kofun period Emperor Ankan.  During the Edo period, the area was mostly tenryō territory ruled by various hatamoto on behalf of the Tokugawa shogunate. The village of Kuniyoshi was established within Isumi District, Chiba with the establishment of the modern municipalities system on April 1, 1889. It was raised to town status on September 22, 1894. The town of Isumi was established on April 29, 1955 from the merger of Kuniyoshi Town with the neighboring villages of Nakagawa and Chimachi.

The city of Isumi was created on December 5, 2005 when the former town of Isumi absorbed the neighboring towns of Misaki and Ōhara (all from Isumi District).

Government
Isumi has a mayor-council form of government with a directly elected mayor and a unicameral city council of 18 members. Isumi contributes one member to the Chiba Prefectural Assembly. In terms of national politics, the city is part of Chiba 11th district of the lower house of the Diet of Japan.

Economy
The local economy is dominated by commercial fishing. Ise-ebi, a species of spiny lobster, is a notable product of Isumi, as are sardines and Japanese amberjack. The middle reaches of the Isumi River provide irrigation for extensive paddy fields for rice production in Isumi. The area also produces tomatoes and cucumbers. The economy is supplemented by the summer tourist traffic to the local beach resorts. The border between Ichinomiya and Isumi City starts at the southern end of the 60-km Kujūkuri Beach adjacent to Taito port. Taito beach and areas to the north are noted surfing areas. The surfing competition at the 2020 Olympic Games will be held at Shidashita Beach just north of Isumi.

Education
Isumi has ten public elementary schools and three public middle schools operated by the city government, and one public high school operated by the Chiba Prefectural Board of Education. The prefecture also operates one special education school for the handicapped.

Transportation
Isumi is approximately 1 hour and 10 minutes from Tokyo Station by limited express train via Ōhara Station on the JR East Sotobō Line. Ōhara Station is also the connecting point for the JR East Sotobō Line and the Isumi Railway Company Isumi Line, which connects the Pacific Coast of east Chiba Prefecture to the interior areas of the Bōsō Peninsula.

Railway
 JR East –  Sotobō Line
  -  -  -  - 
 – Isumi Railway Company - Isumi Line
 -  -  -  -  -

Highways

Local attractions
 Cape Taitō Lighthouse, Cape Taitō, Misaki
 Kiyomizu-dera (Isumi, Chiba) - one of the Bandō Sanjūsankasho Buddhist temples

Notable people from Isumi
 Akemi Masuda, marathon runner
 Kasuganishiki Takahiro, sumo wrestler
 Yoshiharu Tsuge, manga artist

Sister city relations
 - Duluth, Minnesota, USA, since October 3, 1990 (with former Ōhara Town)
 - Woburn, Massachusetts, USA, since August 29, 1985 (with former Isumi Town)
 - Waupun, Wisconsin, USA, since 1997

References

External links

Official Website 

Cities in Chiba Prefecture
Populated coastal places in Japan
Isumi